Judaeorum is Latin for "of [the] Jews". It is contained in the following terms:

Presbyter Judaeorum was the chief official of the Jews of England prior to the Edict of Expulsion
Salve Deus Rex Judaeorum is a volume of poems by English poet Emilia Lanyer published in 1611.
INRI is an acronym of the Latin Jesus Nazarenus Rex Judaeorum, which translates as "Jesus of Nazareth, King of the Jews."